La actriz (English: The Actress) is a Mexican telenovela produced by Televisa and broadcast by Telesistema Mexicano in 1961.

Cast 
Magda Guzmán
Carlos López Moctezuma
Dolores Tinoco
María Douglas

References

External links 

Mexican telenovelas
1962 telenovelas
Televisa telenovelas
1962 Mexican television series debuts
1962 Mexican television series endings
Spanish-language telenovelas

es:La actriz (telenovela de 1962)